Shoreline Amphitheatre is an outdoor amphitheater located in Mountain View, California, in the San Francisco Bay Area. The venue has a capacity of 22,500, with 6,500 reserved seats and 16,000 general admission on the lawn. When the parking lot is utilized for festival stages, the total capacity of the venue can reach 30,000. The venue has hosted popular music festivals such as Lollapalooza and Ozzfest, and also developer conferences such as the Google I/O.

History
The amphitheatre was built in 1985–1986 by the city of Mountain View, in cooperation with local promoter Bill Graham, as part of the Shoreline Park project. Graham designed the amphitheatre to resemble The Grateful Dead's "steal your face" logo.

The premiere season was during the summer of 1986, it was planned to open with a concert by The Grateful Dead, who had to cancel as a result of Jerry Garcia's coma.  The first performance at the amphitheater was comedienne Roseanne Barr, opening for Julio Iglesias on June 29, 1986.

The amphitheatre hosted the "Bay Area" edition of large hip-hop music festival Rolling Loud from October 21–22, 2017. Headliners included Travis Scott, Lil Wayne, and Schoolboy Q.

Built on a landfill
In its opening year, a fan attending a Steve Winwood concert flicked a cigarette lighter and ignited methane that had been leaking from a landfill beneath the theater. Several small fires were reported that season. After those incidents, the city of Mountain View commissioned methane testing studies to define the location of methane vapors emanating from the soil within the amphitheater. These tests were used in developing a design for improved methane monitoring and more efficient methane extraction to ensure the amphitheater became safe as an outdoor venue. Ultimately, the lawn was removed, a gas barrier and methane removal equipment were installed, and then the lawn was re-installed.

See also

List of contemporary amphitheatres
List of concert halls
Live Nation

References

External links
 

Music venues completed in 1986
Amphitheaters in California
Culture in the San Francisco Bay Area
Buildings and structures in Mountain View, California
Music venues in the San Francisco Bay Area
Theatres in California
Tourist attractions in Santa Clara County, California
1986 establishments in California